Zahid Ahmad (born 11 March 1978 in Singapore) is a Singaporean retired footballer.

Career
In 2014, Ahmad was forced to retire after the Singaporean S.League ruled that clubs cannot have more than 5 outfield players over the age of 30.

Personal life 
Ahmad has 2 children.

References

External links
 Zahid Ahmad at Soccerway

Singaporean footballers
Living people
Association football defenders
1978 births
Tampines Rovers FC players